Olderfjord is a village in Porsanger in Troms og Finnmark county, Norway.  The village lies at the end of Olderfjorden on the eastern coast of the Porsanger Peninsula, along the shore of the Porsangerfjorden.

In terms of its longitude, Olderfjord is located further east than any location in Sweden and just east of Helsinki. Being well above 70°N, there is a prolonged midnight sun and polar night in the village.

References

Villages in Finnmark
Porsanger
Populated places of Arctic Norway